Velocity Micro is a privately held boutique computer manufacturer located in Richmond, Virginia (USA), specializing in custom high-performance gaming computers, professional workstations, and high-performance computer solutions. Its extended product line includes gaming PCs, notebooks, CAD workstations, digital media creation workstations, home and home office PCs, home entertainment media centers, Tesla-based supercomputers, and business solutions. All products are custom assembled by hand and supported at the company's headquarters.

History
Velocity Micro traces its origins to 1992 when founder Randy Copeland began designing and producing high-performance computer systems to run CAD software and other demanding applications. These computer systems were custom-built to facilitate the design process and tailored to the extreme needs of each client. Velocity Micro was officially founded in 1997 as an extension of this highly individualized, high-performance computing philosophy.

In 2001, Copeland accepted the opportunity to appear in Maximum PC'''s boutique roundup article entitled "Minor League, Major Performance". The quote which appeared in that February 2002 issue – "put together with the kind of care and craftsmanship the behemoth manufacturers can't offer" – propelled Velocity Micro forward and is still used by the company today.

In May 2007, Velocity Micro acquired former competing boutique builder, Overdrive PC, known for their extreme overclocking capabilities they term "HyperClocking." Since the acquisition, Velocity Micro has incorporated HyperClocking into many of its extreme gaming systems. Overdrive PC remains a separate brand under Velocity Micro ownership.

In 2010, Velocity Micro entered the eReader and tablet computer markets with the release of the first Cruz products: the Cruz Reader and the Cruz Tablet (T100). These Android-based devices featured 7" full-color screens. The Cruz Reader utilized a Resistive touchscreen, whereas the Cruz Tablet made use of the more advanced and responsive capacitive touch screen. Five product generations of Cruz tablets were produced and sold in 7", 8", and 10" screen models with close to a million units in the market by 2012. As of 2013, Velocity Micro no longer supports or offers these or any other Android-based devices for sale.

In 2011, Copeland was named a "Tech Icon" by the PC Magazine staff in an article celebrating 30 years of the PC for his contributions to the industry. He continues to have an active role at Velocity Micro as president and CEO.

In October 2019, Velocity Micro announced a partnership with Ansys that would provide access to resources, licenses, and benchmarks allowing Velocity Micro to build custom computers that are tailored to be integrated with Ansys applications. Velocity Micro has also partnered with Nvidia, AMD, and Intel to provide retail-grade hardware in custom computer builds.

Retail

In August 2005, Velocity Micro began offering pre-configured, high-performance desktops in select Best Buy stores across the country, followed by BestBuy.com that September. In July 2007, Velocity Micro began offering notebooks and desktops in Circuit City Stores across the country. In November 2008, Velocity Micro announced they were also moving into the online retail outlets Amazon.com, Newegg, TigerDirect, and Staples. In January 2009, Velocity Micro announced they were moving into Fry's stores nationwide. In 2010, the Cruz Reader  and Cruz Tablet  went on sale at Borders Books as well as their other numerous other retail partners. As of Jan. 2016, Velocity Micro continued to sell desktops and laptops through Newegg.com and Amazon.com.

Awards
Velocity Micro has won over 60 industry media awards for performance and craftsmanship including 19 Editor's Choice awards from PC Magazine. CNET, Maximum PC, PC World, HardOCP, Computer Gaming World, and Computer Shopper have all awarded Velocity Micro machines high marks.Velocity Micro Vector GX Campus Edition (overclocked Core 2 Duo E6320) Desktop reviews - CNET Reviews[H] Consumer - Velocity Micro Gamers' Edge PCX In Sept. 2007, Velocity Micro won PC Magazine's  "Reader's Choice for Service and Reliability" Award.

In a July 2008 review from PC Magazine, the company received an Editors Choice award for its Vector Campus Edition model. In November 2008, Core i7 based systems from Velocity Micro won Editors' Choice awards from Maximum PC and CNET. More recently, in April 2013 the Velocity Micro Vector Z25 won and Editors Choice award from PC Magazine'', stating "the Z25 is a midtower PC with all the goods". PCMag.com later went on to name the Velocity Micro Vector Z25 as "Best Mainstream Desktop of 2013" after consideration of all mainstream desktop computers covered during the entire year 2013. In August 2014, Velocity Micro followed up on that award with another Editors' Choice from PCMag.com, this one for its Edge Z55 gaming PC. Said the editors, "The Velocity Micro Edge Z55 blows away the competition ...and costs $3,000 less. We wholeheartedly award the Edge Z55 our Editors' Choice for high-end gaming desktop PCs".

Velocity Micro participated in the 2018 Intel Extreme Rig Challenge and won the award for Best Performance, providing a 40% higher score than the previous year's entry.

References

Computer hardware companies
Home computer hardware companies
Computer companies of the United States
Manufacturing companies based in Richmond, Virginia
Companies established in 1997